Robert O'Hara Burke (6 May 1821c. 28 June 1861) was an Irish soldier and police officer who achieved fame as an Australian explorer. He was the leader of the ill-fated Burke and Wills expedition, which was the first expedition to cross Australia from south to north, finding a route across the continent from the settled areas of Victoria to the Gulf of Carpentaria. The expedition party was well equipped, but Burke was not experienced in bushcraft. A Royal Commission report conducted upon the failure of the expedition was a censure of Burke's judgement.

Early years 
Burke was born in St Clerens, County Galway, Ireland in May 1821.  He was the second of three sons of James Hardiman Burke (1788 – January 1854), an officer in the British army 7th Royal Fusiliers, and Anne Louisa Burke née O'Hara (married 1817, d.1844).

Robert O'Hara was one of seven children;
 John Hardiman Burke (d. August 1863)
 Robert O'Hara Burke (6 May 1821 – 28 June 1861)
 James Thomas Burke (c. 1828 – 7 July 1854)
 Fanny Marie Burke (married John Blakeney)
 Elizabeth Burke (married Lt. Col Menzies)
 Hester Albinia Burke (unmarried, d. 10 November 1866)
 Anne Celestine Burke (married Major Horace de Vere, d.1914)

James Thomas Burke was a Lieutenant in the Royal Engineers, and on 7 July 1854 at the battle of Giurgevo became the first British officer killed in the Crimean war.

Military career 
Burke entered the Royal Military Academy, Woolwich in May 1835. In December 1836 he failed his probationary exam and went to Belgium to further his education. In 1841, at the age of twenty he entered the Austrian army and in August 1842 was promoted to Second Lieutenant in the Prince Regent's 7th Reuss Regiment of the Hungarian Hussars. He spent most of his time in the Imperial Austrian Army posted to northern Italy and in April 1847 was promoted to 1st Lieutenant. Towards the end of 1847 he suffered health problems and went to Recoaro spa in northern Italy, then Gräfenberg (now Lázně Jeseník) and finally Aachen before resigning from the Austrian army in June 1848 after charges against him relating to debts and absence without leave were dropped.

Police career 
After returning to Ireland in 1848, he joined the Irish Constabulary (later the Royal Irish Constabulary). He did his cadet training at Phoenix Park Depot in Dublin between November 1849 and January 1850, was promoted to 3rd Class Sub-Inspector and he was stationed in County Kildare. At the end of 1850, he transferred to the Mounted Police in Dublin.

Migrating to Australia 
Burke migrated to Australia in 1853. He left Queenstown, County Cork on 24 November 1852 on the S.S. Rodney which was carrying 342 convicts. He arrived in Hobart, Tasmania on 12 February 1853 and promptly sailed for Melbourne. On 1 April 1853 he joined the recently established Victoria police force. Initially, he worked as Acting Inspector under the Chief Commissioner William Henry Fancourt Mitchell in the Parish of Jika Jika in the northern suburbs of Melbourne, but on 1 November 1853 he was appointed a magistrate, was promoted to Police Inspector, and was posted to Carlsruhe. On 31 December 1853 he was promoted to District Inspector of the Ovens District and early in 1854 he moved to Beechworth to relieve Inspector John Giles Price.

After the unfortunate death of his brother, James Thomas, in the Crimean War, Burke decided to enlist. He left Australia on the S.S. Marco Polo on 25 March 1856 for England, but, by the time he arrived in Liverpool in June, peace had been declared and the war ended. Burke re-boarded the Marco Polo and returned to Victoria, arriving in Melbourne on 2 December 1856.

He resumed his posting at Beechworth and from there attended the "Buckland Valley" riots near Bright against the Chinese gold miners in 1857. In November 1858 he was transferred to Castlemaine as Police Superintendent on £550 p.a. plus a groom and quarters at Broadoaks on Gingell Street.

After the South Australian explorer, John McDouall Stuart had reached the centre of Australia, the South Australian parliament offered a reward of £2,000 for the promotion of an expedition to cross the continent from the south to north, generally following Stuart's route. He also partnered with another explorer who wanted to discover things about Australia.

Burke and Wills Expedition 

In June 1860, Burke was appointed to lead the Victorian Exploring Expedition with William John Wills, his third-in-command, as surveyor and astronomical observer.

The expedition left Melbourne on Monday, 20 August 1860 with a total of 19 men, 27 camels and 23 horses. They reached Menindee on 23 September 1860 where several people resigned, including the second-in-command, George James Landells and the medical officer, Dr. Hermann Beckler.

Cooper Creek, 400 miles further on, was reached on 11 November 1860 by the advance group, the remainder being intended to catch up. After a break, Burke decided to make a dash to the Gulf of Carpentaria, leaving on 16 December 1860. William Brahe was left in charge of the remaining party. The small team of Burke, William Wills, John King and Charley Gray reached the mangroves on the estuary of the Flinders River, near where the town of Normanton now stands, on 9 February 1861. Flooding rains and swamps meant they never saw open ocean.

Already weakened by starvation and exposure, their progress on the return journey was slow and hampered by the tropical monsoon downpours of the wet season. Gray died four days before they reached the rendezvous at Cooper Creek.
The other three rested for a day when they buried him.
They eventually reached the rendezvous point on 21 April 1861, 9 hours after the rest of the party had given up waiting and left, leaving a note and some food, as they had not been relieved by the party supposed to be returning from Menindee.

They attempted to reach Mount Hopeless, the furthest outpost of pastoral settlement in South Australia, which was closer than Menindee, but failed and returned to Cooper Creek. While waiting for rescue Wills died of exhaustion and starvation. Soon after, Burke also died, at a place now called Burke's Waterhole on Cooper Creek in South Australia. The exact date of Burke's death is uncertain, but has generally been accepted to be 28 June 1861.

King survived with the help of Aborigines until he was rescued in September by Alfred William Howitt. Howitt buried Burke and Wills before returning to Melbourne. In 1862 Howitt returned to Cooper Creek and disinterred Burke and Wills' bodies, taking them first to Adelaide and then by steamer to Melbourne where they were laid in state for two weeks. On 23 January 1863 Burke and Wills received a State Funeral and were buried in Melbourne General Cemetery. On that day Stuart and his companions, having successfully completed the south-north crossing, were received back at a large ceremony in Adelaide.

Places named after Burke 
Burketown, Queensland
Burke River in western Queensland.
O'Haras Gap, Selwyn Ranges, Queensland

Places named by Burke 
Cloncurry River was named by Burke after Lady Cloncurry. She was his cousin, Elizabeth Kirwan, who had married Lord Cloncurry. Lady Cloncurry was the daughter of Burke's paternal Aunt Penelope and her husband John Kirwan.

See also 

 John King (explorer)
 List of people on stamps of Ireland
 William John Wills

Notes

References 

Kathleen Fitzpatrick, 'Burke, Robert O'Hara (1821–1861)', Australian Dictionary of Biography, Volume 3, MUP, 1969, pp 301–303.

The [Melbourne] Argus, 1861. "The Burke and Wills exploring expedition: An account of the crossing the continent of Australia from Cooper's Creek to Carpentaria, with biographical sketches of Robert O'Hara Burke and William John Wills". Melbourne: Wilson and Mackinnon.
Bonyhady, Tim, 1991. Burke and Wills: From Melbourne to myth. Balmain: David Ell Press. .
Burke and Wills Outback Conference 2003, 2005. The Inaugural Burke & Wills Outback Conference : Cloncurry 2003 : a collation of presentations. Dave Phoenix, Cairns Qld. 
Clune, Frank, 1937. Dig: A drama of central Australia. Sydney: Angus and Robertson.
Corke, David G, 1996. The Burke and Wills Expedition: A study in evidence. Melbourne: Educational Media International. 
Henry, William, 1997. The shimmering waste: The life and times of Robert O'Hara Burke. Galway, Ireland.: W Henry Publisher. 
Howitt, Alfred William, 1907. "Personal reminiscences of Central Australia and the Burke and Wills Expedition: Presidents inaugural address". Journal of the Australasian Association for the Advancement of Science. 1907  (Adelaide, 1907.), 43p.
Jackson, Andrew, 1862. Robert O'Hara Bourke [sic] and the Australian Exploring Expedition of 1860. London: Smith, Elder & Co.
Manwaring, William Henry, 1970. "A contemporary's view of Robert O’Hara Burke". La Trobe Library Journal. Vol. 2  (No. 6).
Moorehead, Alan, 1963. Cooper's Creek. New York and Evanston: Harper & Row, Publishers, 1963. 
Murgatroyd, Sarah, 2002. The Dig Tree. Melbourne: Text Publishing. 
Victoria: Parliament, 1862. Burke and Wills Commission. Report of the Commissioners appointed to enquire into and report upon the circumstances connected with the sufferings and death of Robert O'Hara Burke and William John Wills, the Victorian Explorers. Melbourne: John Ferres Government Printer.
Wills, William John, & Wills, Dr William, 1863. A successful exploration through the interior of Australia, from Melbourne to the Gulf of Carpentaria: from the journals and letters of William John Wills. London: Richard Bentley.

External links 

 Burke & Wills Web A comprehensive website containing many of the historical documents relating to the Burke & Wills Expedition.
 The Burke & Wills Historical Society The Burke & Wills Historical Society.

1821 births
1861 deaths
Australian people of Anglo-Irish descent
Irish Anglicans
Irish explorers
Explorers of Australia
Explorers from Melbourne
Australian people of Irish descent
Royal Irish Constabulary officers
Deaths by starvation
People from County Galway
Burke and Wills expedition
Burials at Melbourne General Cemetery
Explorers of Queensland